The UK Singles Chart is one of many music charts compiled by the Official Charts Company that calculates the best-selling singles of the week in the United Kingdom. Before 2004, the chart was only based on the sales of physical singles. This list shows singles that peaked in the Top 10 of the UK Singles Chart during 1978, as well as singles which peaked in 1977 and 1979 but were in the top 10 in 1978. The entry date is when the single appeared in the top 10 for the first time (week ending, as published by the Official Charts Company, which is six days after the chart is announced).

One-hundred and twenty-one singles were in the top ten in 1978. Seven singles from 1977 remained in the top 10 for several weeks at the beginning of the year, while "Song for Guy" by Elton John, "Lay Your Love on Me" by Racey and "Y.M.C.A." by The Village People were all released in 1978 but did not reach their peak until 1979. "It's a Heartache by Bonnie Tyler and "Love's Unkind" by Donna Summer were the singles from 1977 to reach their peak in 1978. Eighteen artists scored multiple entries in the top 10 in 1978. Blondie, Commodores, Kate Bush, Sarah Brightman and The Village People were among the many artists who achieved their first UK charting top 10 single in 1978.

The 1977 Christmas number-one, "Mull of Kintyre" by Wings, remained at number-one for the first four weeks of 1978. The first new number-one single of the year was "Uptown Top Ranking" by Althea & Donna. Overall, fourteen different singles peaked at number-one in 1978, with Boney M., John Travolta and Olivia Newton-John (2) having the joint most singles hit that position.

Background

Multiple entries
One-hundred and twenty-one singles charted in the top 10 in 1978, with one-hundred and thirteen singles reaching their peak this year.

Eighteen artists scored multiple entries in the top 10 in 1978. Bee Gees and Darts shared the record for most top 10 hits in 1978 with four hit singles each.

Kate Bush was one of a number of artists with two top-ten entries, including the number-one single "Wuthering Heights". ABBA, Bob Marley and the Wailers, The Boomtown Rats, Rose Royce, Sham 69 and Wings were the other artists who had multiple top 10 entries in 1978.

Chart debuts
Fifty-eight artists achieved their first top 10 single in 1978, either as a lead or featured artist. Of these, four went on to record another hit single that year: Bob Marley and the Wailers, The Boomtown Rats, Kate Bush and Sham 69. Blondie, Chic and John Travolta all had two other entries in their breakthrough year.

The following table (collapsed on desktop site) does not include acts who had previously charted as part of a group and secured their first top 10 solo single.

Notes
Gerry Rafferty was previously part of Stealers Wheel, who charted with the classic single "Stuck in the Middle with You" in 1973. "Baker Street" was his first top 10 solo entry. Justin Hayward started off as lead singer, songwriter and guitarist for The Moody Blues, among his writing credits the number two hit "Question". The composition "Forever Autumn" marked his first appearance in the chart on his own.

Public Image Ltd included members from several other bands - Johnny Rotten had recently left Sex Pistols and Keith Levene came over from The Clash (although Levene never recorded a top 10 single as part of his old group).

Charity singles
"Too Much Heaven" was released by Bee Gees in aid of UNICEF, with all publishing royalties going towards the charity to support its work. The single peaked at number three on 9 December 1978, spending 6 weeks in the top ten. The group later performed the song at the Music for UNICEF Concert in January 1979, celebrating the International Year of the Child. A total of $7 million dollars in publishing royalties was raised towards the charity from sales of the single.

Songs from films
Original songs from various films entered the top 10 throughout the year. These included "Stayin' Alive" "Night Fever", "If I Can't Have You" & "More Than a Woman" (from Saturday Night Fever) and "You're the One That I Want", "Grease", "Summer Nights", "Sandy" & "Hopelessly Devoted to You" (Grease).

Best-selling singles
Boney M. had the best-selling single of the year with "Rivers of Babylon"/"Brown Girl in the Ring". The song spent nineteen weeks in the top 10 (including five weeks at number one) and was certified platinum by the BPI. "You're the One That I Want" by John Travolta & Olivia Newton-John came in second place. John Travolta & Olivia Newton-John's "Summer Nights", "Three Times a Lady" from Commodores and "The Smurf Song" by Father Abraham & The Smurfs made up the top five. Singles by Boney M. ("Mary's Boy Child – Oh My Lord"), Bee Gees, The Boomtown Rats, ABBA and Brian and Michael were also in the top ten best-selling singles of the year.

Top-ten singles
Key

Entries by artist

The following table shows artists who achieved two or more top 10 entries in 1978, including singles that reached their peak in 1977. The figures include both main artists and featured artists, while appearances on ensemble charity records are also counted for each artist. The total number of weeks an artist spent in the top ten in 1978 is also shown.

Notes

 "Y.M.C.A" reached its peak of number-one on 6 January 1979 (week ending).
 "Lay Your Love on Me" reached its peak of number three on 6 January 1979 (week ending).
 "Ally's Tartan Army" was released to celebrate the Scotland national team's qualification for the 1978 FIFA World Cup.
 "Rivers of Babylon"/"Brown Girl In the Ring" re-entered the top 10 at number 10 on 5 August 1978 (week ending) for 9 weeks.
 "Ole Ola (Mulher Brasileira)" was recorded by the Scotland national team (with the added vocals of Rod Stewart) as the official single supporting their 1978 FIFA World Cup campaign.
 "5.7.0.5" re-entered the top 10 at number 8 on 19 August 1978 (week ending).
 "Too Much Heaven" was released as a charity single in aid of Unicef and was performed at the Music for UNICEF Concert in January 1979.
 Figure includes single that peaked in 1977.
 Figure includes single that first charted in 1977 but peaked in 1978.

See also
1978 in British music
List of number-one singles from the 1970s (UK)

References
General

Specific

External links
1978 singles chart archive at the Official Charts Company (click on relevant week)

Top 10 singles
United Kingdom
1978